In cryptography, the Standards for Efficient Cryptography Group (SECG) is an international consortium founded by Certicom in 1998. The group exists to develop commercial standards for efficient and interoperable cryptography based on elliptic curve cryptography (ECC).

Links and documents
 SECG home page
 SEC 1: Elliptic Curve Cryptography (Version 1.0 - Superseded by Version 2.0)
 SEC 1: Elliptic Curve Cryptography (Version 2.0)
 SEC 2: Recommended Elliptic Curve Domain Parameters (Version 1.0 - Superseded by Version 2.0
 SEC 2: Recommended Elliptic Curve Domain Parameters (Version 2.0)
 Certicom Patent Letter

See also
 Elliptic curve cryptography

Cryptography organizations
Cryptography standards